Whitewater Glacier is in the U.S. state of Oregon. The glacier is situated in the Cascade Range on the east and northeast slopes of Mount Jefferson.

See also
 List of glaciers in the United States

References

Glaciers of Mount Jefferson
Glaciers of Jefferson County, Oregon
Glaciers of Marion County, Oregon
Glaciers of Oregon